A Lucky Man (Spanish: Un hombre de suerte) is a 1930 American comedy film directed by Benito Perojo and starring Roberto Rey, María Luz Callejo and Valentín Parera. It is a Spanish-language film made for the Hollywood company Paramount Pictures at their Joinville Studios in Paris. Separate versions were also made in French and Swedish. The French version is known as A Hole in the Wall.

It is now considered a lost film.

Cast
Roberto Rey as Luciano Barbosa / Lucas Gómez  
María Luz Callejo as Urbana  
Valentín Parera as Castrenese  
 as Doña Bermuda  
Carlos San Martín as Don Digno Lesaca  
Joaquín Carrasco as El jardinero  
Amelia Muñoz as Isidra  
Helena D'Algy as Salomé 
Rosita Díaz Gimeno 
Roberto Iglesias

References

External links

Spanish-language American films
1930 comedy films
American comedy films
Films directed by Benito Perojo
Paramount Pictures films
Films shot at Joinville Studios
Lost American films
American black-and-white films
American multilingual films
American films based on plays
1930 multilingual films
1930 lost films
Lost comedy films
1930s Spanish-language films
1930s American films